Cedri is a village in Tuscany, central Italy,  administratively a frazione of the comune of Peccioli, province of Pisa. At the time of the 2006 parish census its population was 35.

Cedri is about 50 km from Pisa and 13 km from Peccioli.

References 

Frazioni of the Province of Pisa